Gavin Bennion (born 31 December 1993) is a Wales international rugby league footballer who plays as a  or second row forward for the Swinton Lions in RFL League 1.

Bennion has previously played for the Mackay Cutters and spent time on loan at the Swinton Lions, Oldham RLFC (Heritage No. 1398) and Featherstone Rovers.

Rochdale Hornets (re-join) 
On 11 Jul 2020 it was reported that he had signed for Rochdale Hornets in the RFL League 1

Background
Bennion was born in Warrington, Cheshire, England.

International career
He was selected in the Wales 9s squad for the 2019 Rugby League World Cup 9s.

References

External links
Salford Red Devils profile
Halifax profile
2017 RLWC profile
SL profile
Wales profile
Welsh profile

1993 births
Living people
Featherstone Rovers players
Halifax R.L.F.C. players
Mackay Cutters players
Oldham R.L.F.C. players
Rochdale Hornets players
Rugby league players from Warrington
Rugby league props
Rugby league second-rows
Swinton Lions players
Wales national rugby league team players
Warrington Wolves players